Lady Keane College, established in 1935, is oldest women's general degree college situated in Shillong, Meghalaya. This college is also first women's degree college in North East India. This college is affiliated with the North Eastern Hill University.

Departments

Science
Physics
Mathematics
Chemistry
Botany
Zoology
Biochemistry
Computer Science

Arts
Languages
History
Education
Economics
Philosophy
Sociology
Political Science

References

External links

Universities and colleges in Meghalaya
Colleges affiliated to North-Eastern Hill University
Educational institutions established in 1935
1935 establishments in India